Barbara J. Spencer is an Australian-Canadian economist.

Spencer received her Bachelor of Economics in 1967 at Australian National University, her Masters of Economics in 1970 at Monash University, and her Ph.D. in 1979 at Carnegie Mellon University. Since 1985 she has been a Research Associate of the National Bureau of Economic Research and, since 1988, she has been the Asia Pacific Professor in Trade Policy at the University of British Columbia. Her research interests include international trade theory and policy, industrial organization, international business, business and government, as well as intermediate microeconomics.

From 2004 to 2005 she was President of the Canadian Economics Association.

Her 1985 paper with fellow Canadian economist James Brander titled Export Subsidies and International Market Share Rivalry, which introduced the Brander-Spencer Model of International Trade was the most cited paper in The Journal of International Economics since its inception in 1971.

Notes

External links 
 Barbara Spencer at the Sauder School of Business
 Spencer, Barbara J. at isiknowledge.com

Year of birth missing (living people)
Living people
Australian academics
Academic staff of the University of British Columbia
Canadian economists
Canadian women economists